Prophantis androstigmata is a moth in the family Crambidae. It was described by George Hampson in 1918. It is found on New Guinea and Australia, where it has been recorded from Queensland.

The wings are brown with yellow margins and white spots on the forewings.

References

Spilomelinae
Moths described in 1918